Laurens "Lau" Veldt (born 18 June 1953, in Amsterdam) is a track cyclist from the Netherlands.  He won the bronze medal at the 1978 UCI Track Cycling World Championships in the men's tandam together with Sjaak Pieters. He competed in the men's sprint at the 1980 Summer Olympics.

Lau is the father of cyclist Tim Veldt.

See also
 List of Dutch Olympic cyclists
 List of people from Amsterdam

References

1953 births
Living people
Dutch male cyclists
Olympic cyclists of the Netherlands
Cyclists at the 1980 Summer Olympics
Cyclists from Amsterdam